Christine Battersby FRSA (born 3 March 1946) is a British philosopher and Reader Emerita in Philosophy at the University of Warwick. She was the visiting Fleishhacker Chair of Philosophy at the University of San Francisco during April 2013. Battersby is a Fellow of the Royal Society of Arts. She is known for her research on feminist aesthetics.

Books
 The Sublime, Terror and Human Difference, Routledge, 2007
 The Phenomenal Woman: Feminist Metaphysics and the Patterns of Identity, Routledge, 1998
 Gender and Genius: Towards a Feminist Aesthetics, Indiana University Press, 1990

References

External links
Christine Battersby at the University of Warwick

British philosophers
Philosophy academics
Living people
Academics of the University of Warwick
1946 births
Philosophers of art
Alumni of the University of Sussex
20th-century British non-fiction writers
21st-century British non-fiction writers
20th-century British women writers
21st-century British women writers